Faculdade de Informática e Administração Paulista  (FIAP) is a higher education institution in São Paulo, Brazil. It was created in São Paulo, in 1993. It has traditions in the area of Informatics. Bachelor courses include Computer engineering, Information system, Management, Computer network, Database, Internet system, and System analysis and development. It also teaches MBA Programs level courses.

External links
 Official website

References

Educational institutions established in 1993
Universities and colleges in São Paulo (state)
1993 establishments in Brazil